The Comox Valley Glacier Kings (nicknamed the Yetis) are a junior "B" ice hockey team based in Courtenay, British Columbia, Canada. They are members of the North Division of the Vancouver Island Junior Hockey League (VIJHL). The Glacier Kings play their home games at Comox Valley Sports Centre, which has a capacity of 1,400. David Webb is the team's president. Jeff Dubois is the coach and General Manager, and they are captained by forward Damian Rennie.  The Glacier Kings were the hosts of the 2013 Cyclone Taylor Cup.

History

The Glacier Kings joined the league in 1992 as an expansion team. In its VIJHL history, the team has won the Brent Patterson Memorial Trophy once, in 1995. The Glacier Kings have won the Andy Hebenton Trophy once, as the team with the league's best regular season record in 1993.

Season-by-season record

Note: GP = Games played, W = Wins, L = Losses, T = Ties, OTL = Overtime Losses, Pts = Points, GF = Goals for, GA = Goals against

NHL alumni
Ty Wishart

Awards and trophies
Brent Patterson Memorial Trophy
1994-95
Playoff MVP - Peter Mattson
Andy Hebenton Trophy
1992-93

Grant Peart Memorial Trophy
1993-94, 1994–95, 2000–01, 2007–08, 2008–09, 2009–10

Doug Morton Trophy
Craig Pearson: 1992-93
Justin Denroche: 1993-94Jamie Robertson Trophy
Craig Pearson: 1992-93

Larry Lamoureaux Trophy
Clayton Lainsbury: 1998-99
Jackson Garrett: 2006-07
Trent Murdoch: 2007-08
Mitch Ball: 2009-10

Walt McWilliams Memorial Trophy
Scott Zaichkowsky: 1994-95
1995-96

References

External links
Official website of the Comox Valley Glacier Kings

Courtenay, British Columbia
Ice hockey teams in British Columbia
1992 establishments in British Columbia
Ice hockey clubs established in 1992